Gobea is a corregimiento in Donoso District, Colón Province, Panama with a population of 794 as of 2010. Its population as of 1990 was 610; its population as of 2000 was 702.

References

Corregimientos of Colón Province